Barrie Mitchell Osborne  (born February 7, 1944) is an American film producer, production manager and director.

Biography
The son of Hertha Schwarz and William Osborne, Barrie was born in New York City and grew up in New Rochelle, New York where he graduated New Rochelle High School. He is an alumnus of Carleton College in Northfield, Minnesota and currently lives in Wellington, New Zealand. He was appointed an Officer of the New Zealand Order of Merit (ONZM), for services to the film industry, in the 2017 New Year Honours.

Osborne's most notable work is The Lord of the Rings: The Return of the King for which he, Peter Jackson, and Fran Walsh received the Academy Award for Best Picture. He also produced the 2013 The Great Gatsby remake, starring Leonardo DiCaprio.

In 2014, Osborne, Alan B. Curtiss, and Mexican entrepreneur Max Appedole, released Gloria, a biopic of controversial Mexican pop star Gloria Trevi, directed by  Christian Keller.

Osborne is also preparing a possible movie trilogy about the Viking king Harald Hardrada.

Filmography

Producer

 Kojak (1973) (unit manager)
 Apocalypse Now (1979) (production manager) - as Barry Osborne
 Cutter's Way (1981) (associate producer/unit production manager)
 The Big Chill (1983) (associate producer/unit production manager) - as Barrie Osborne
 Octopussy (1983) (production manager)
 The Cotton Club (1984) (line producer)
 Fandango (1985) (associate producer/unit production manager)
 Peggy Sue Got Married (1986) (executive producer/unit production manager)
 Child's Play (1988) (executive producer)
 Dick Tracy (1990) (executive producer)
 Child's Play (1992) (executive producer)
 Wilder Napalm (1993) (executive producer/unit production manager)
 Rapa-Nui (1994) (executive producer)
 China Moon (1994) (producer)
 The Fan (1996) (executive producer)
 Face/Off (1997) (producer)
 The Matrix (1999) (executive producer)
 The Lord of the Rings: The Fellowship of the Ring (2001) (producer)
 The Last Place on Earth (2002) (producer)
 The Lord of the Rings: The Two Towers (2002) (producer)
 The Long and Short of It (2003) (executive in charge of production)
 The Lord of the Rings: The Return of the King (2003) (producer)
 Little Fish (2005) (executive producer)
 The Water Horse: Legend of the Deep (2007) (producer)
 The Warrior's Way (2010) (producer)
 The Great Gatsby (2013) (executive producer)
 Pete's Dragon (2016) (executive producer)
 The Meg (2018) (executive producer)
 Mulan (2020) (executive producer)

Other
 American Hot Wax (1978) (second assistant director)
 The China Syndrome (1979) (second assistant director)
 Dick Tracy (1990) (second unit director)
 The Lord of the Rings: The Fellowship of the Ring (2001) (additional second unit director)

References

External links 
 
 Feature Financing Partner

1944 births
Film producers from New York (state)
Carleton College alumni
Living people
New Zealand film producers
Producers who won the Best Picture Academy Award
Businesspeople from New Rochelle, New York
Golden Globe Award-winning producers
American expatriates in New Zealand
Officers of the New Zealand Order of Merit
Filmmakers who won the Best Film BAFTA Award
Unit production managers
New Rochelle High School alumni